Rolls – 28 (1951) is an Ollywood / Oriya film directed by Kalyan Gupta

Cast
 Bimala Devi
 Kishori Devi
 Giridhari
 Ratikanta Padhi
 Pankaj
 Anima Pedini
 Rajendra

References

External links
 

1951 films
1950s Odia-language films
Indian black-and-white films